The Goria Cabinet was the 45th cabinet of the Italian Republic. It held office from 1987 to 1988.

After several months of uncertainty and discontent within the majority, Goria decided to resign on 11 March 1988 after the PSI had expressed strong opposition to the way the government had approved the reopening of the construction site of the Montalto di Castro nuclear power plant.

Party breakdown
 Christian Democracy (DC): Prime minister, 14 ministers, 31 undersecretaries
 Italian Socialist Party (PSI): 9 ministers, 17 undersecretaries
 Italian Republican Party (PRI): 3 ministers, 3 undersecretaries
 Italian Democratic Socialist Party (PSDI): 2 ministers, 4 undersecretaries
 Italian Liberal Party (PLI): 1 minister, 4 undersecretaries

Composition

|}

References

Italian governments
Cabinets established in 1987
Cabinets disestablished in 1988
1987 establishments in Italy
1988 disestablishments in Italy